William "Bill" Poon is a Chinese-British chef and restaurateur. He started his culinary career at a young age. A seventh generation Master Chef, he worked in Macau and his native Hong Kong where he also trained with a Swiss pâtissière. He came to the UK in the mid-sixties and, disappointed by the quality of Chinese food to be found in England at the time, he and his wife, Cecilia, opened the first Poon's Restaurant in 1973 on Lisle Street in Chinatown.

Poon's & Co. was acclaimed for its authentic Cantonese Menu and was famous for its Chinese wind-dry sausages (臘腸) and wind-dry duck made to an old family recipe. It was also one of the first Chinese restaurants in London to introduce Clay Pot Rice (煲仔飯).

In 1976, Bill and Cecilia Poon opened the iconic Poon's of Covent Garden at 41 King Street. In 1980, Poon's of Covent Garden was awarded a Michelin Star. Amongst its customers were Mick Jagger, Jerry Hall, Frank Sinatra, Sean Connery, Roger Moore, Jane Seymour and Barbra Streisand. In 1985 Bill and Cecilia opened Poon's of Geneva and Poon's in The City followed in 1992. Bill's sister took over the Lisle Street business and Bill's brother was responsible for Poon's in Leicester Street, Russell Square and Whiteley's. At its peak, there were seven Poon's restaurants. Bill and Cecilia retired from the restaurant scene in 2006.

An active member of the Chinese community in London and well-respected in the industry, Bill sat on the judging panel of Chinese Masterchef (organised by Westminster City Council) and was nominated in 2006 in the Pearl Awards for the Promotion of Excellence in Chinese Cuisine.
Bill Poon continues to work in support of community projects and is currently the Chair of Euro-Chinese Literature Association (歐華文聯), and the Permanent President of Shunde UK Association.

In February 2018, Bill Poon's daughter, Amy, resurrected the family business in the form of a 3-month pop-up in Clerkenwell.

References

External links
 Master Chef William Poon at Poons in the City

1979 births 
Living people
British people of Chinese descent
English people of Chinese descent
English restaurateurs
English chefs
British restaurateurs 
British chefs